The molecular formula C6H10 (molar mass: 82.14 g/mol) may refer to:

 Cyclohexene
 2,3-Dimethyl-1,3-butadiene
 1,3-Hexadiene
 1,4-Hexadiene
 1,5-Hexadiene
 2,4-Hexadiene
 1-Hexyne
 2-Hexyne
 3-Hexyne
 Methylenecyclopentane
4-Methyl-1-pentyne
4-Methyl-2-pentyne
3-Methyl-1-pentyne
3,3-Dimethyl-1-butyne

Molecular formulas